The 2009–10 Football Conference season was the sixth season with the Football Conference consisting of three divisions, and the thirty-first season overall. The Conference covers the top two levels of Non-League football in England. The Conference Premier is the fifth highest level of the overall pyramid, whilst the Conference North and Conference South exist at the sixth level. The top team (Stevenage Borough) and the winner of the play-off (Oxford United) of the National division were promoted to Football League Two. The bottom four were scheduled to be relegated to the North or South divisions, but in the event two teams (Salisbury City and Chester City) were expelled and only the bottom two clubs (Ebbsfleet United and Grays Athletic) were relegated with them. The champions of the North and South divisions (Southport and Newport County respectively) were promoted to the National division, alongside the play-off winners from each division (Fleetwood Town and Bath City). The bottom three in each of the North and South divisions were relegated to the premier divisions of the Northern Premier League, Isthmian League or Southern League. For sponsorship reasons, the Conference Premier was frequently referred to as the Blue Square Premier.

Conference Premier
A total of 24 teams contested the division, including 18 sides from last season, two relegated from the Football League Two, two promoted from the Conference North and two promoted from the Conference South.

Promotion and relegation
Teams promoted from 2008–09 Conference North
 Tamworth
 Gateshead

Teams promoted from 2008–09 Conference South
 AFC Wimbledon
 Hayes & Yeading United

Teams relegated from 2008–09 League Two
 Chester City
 Luton Town

Luton Town became the first team to drop from the Football League Championship to the Conference in successive seasons and in the process ended an 89-year stay in the Football League. Their matches against eventual playoff winners Oxford United made them the first clubs to face each other in all the top five tiers of English football.

On 26 February 2010, Chester City were expelled from the Conference for numerous rule breaches. Since no appeal was forthcoming, their results were expunged on 8 March 2010.

League table

Play-offs

Stadia and locations

Results

Season statistics

Top scorers
Updated to games played on 24 April.

1.Moses Ashikodi scored six goals for Kettering Town
2.Daryl Clare scored two goals for Mansfield Town

Scoring
First goal of the season: Lee Boylan for Stevenage Borough against Tamworth, 12:56 minutes (8 August 2009)
Last goal of the season: Adam Marriott for Cambridge United against Altrincham, 92:58 minutes (24 April 2010)
First penalty kick of the season: Lee Boylan (scored) for Stevenage Borough against Tamworth, 12:56 minutes (8 August 2009)
First own goal of the Season: Jamie Stuart (Rushden & Diamonds) for Salisbury City, 46:42 (8 August 2009)
First hat-trick of the season: Matt Tubbs for Salisbury City against Hayes & Yeading (31 August 2009)
Quickest hat-trick: 7 minutes – Mitchell Cole for Stevenage Borough against Eastbourne Borough (2 March 2010)
Fastest goal scored in a match: 36 seconds – Lewis Taylor  for AFC Wimbledon against Forest Green Rovers (10 October 2009)
Goal scored at the latest point of a game: 90+6 minutes and 51 seconds – Keith Keane for Luton Town against Oxford United (9 February 2010)
Widest winning margin: 8 goals
Rushden & Diamonds 8–0 Gateshead (13 March 2010)
Luton Town 8–0 Hayes & Yeading United (27 March 2010)
Widest away winning margin: 6 goals – Eastbourne Borough 0–6 Stevenage Borough (2 March 2010)
Most goals in one half: 7 goals – Luton Town 8–0 Hayes & Yeading United (27 March 2010)
Most goals in one half by a single team: 7 goals – Luton Town 8–0 Hayes & Yeading United (27 March 2010)
Most goals scored by the losing team: 4 goals – Rushden & Diamonds 5–4 Grays Athletic (12 September 2009)
Most own goals scored in one match: 2 goals – AFC Wimbledon 2–2 Wrexham (30 March 2010)

Discipline
First yellow card of the season: Jason Walker for Barrow against Cambridge United, 2 minutes and 57 seconds (8 August 2009)
First red card of the season: Sean Newton for Barrow against Cambridge United, 52 minutes and 31 seconds (8 August 2009)
Card given at latest point in a game: Damian Batt (red) at 90+8 minutes and 17 seconds for Oxford United against Tamworth (16 January 2010)

Sequences
Longest winning run: 9 games – Luton Town, ended 10 April 2010.
Longest unbeaten run: 17 games – Stevenage Borough, ended 1 December 2009.
Longest losing run: 8 games – Grays Athletic, ended 27 February 2010.
Longest run without winning: 20 games – Grays Athletic, ended 13 April 2010.
Longest run of successive home wins: 7 games
Luton Town – from 9 March 2010 to 17 April 2010.
Stevenage Borough – from 1 January 2010 to 3 April 2010.
Longest run of successive away wins: 8 games – Stevenage Borough, from 24 February 2010 until end of season.

Clean sheets
Most clean sheets: 27 – Stevenage Borough. 
Fewest clean sheets: 7 – Eastbourne Borough and Ebbsfleet United.
Consecutive clean sheets: 6 games without conceding:
AFC Wimbledon – from 24 November 2009 to 1 January 2010.
Oxford United – from 29 August 2009 to 22 September 2009.
Stevenage Borough – from 5 April 2010 until end of season.

Monthly awards

Conference North

A total of 22 teams contested the division, including 17 sides from last season, one relegated from the Conference Premier and four promoted from the lower leagues.

In April 2009, the Conference decided to demote King's Lynn at the end of the 2008–09 season, because their ground did not meet Conference standards. Farsley Celtic resigned from the league on 8 March 2010 and their playing record was expunged on 12 March. Both Harrogate Town and Vauxhall Motors were reprieved from relegation following Farsley Celtic's withdrawal from the league, Chester's expulsion from the Conference Premier and Northwich Victoria's demotion to the Northern Premier League under financial rules.

Promotion and relegation
Teams promoted from 2008–09 Northern Premier League Premier Division
 Eastwood Town
 Ilkeston Town

Teams promoted from 2008–09 Southern League Premier Division
 Corby Town
 Gloucester City

Teams relegated from 2008–09 Conference Premier
 Northwich Victoria

League table

Play-offs

Stadia and locations

Results

Monthly awards

Conference South

A total of 22 teams contested the division, including 17 sides from last season, three relegated from the Conference Premier and two promoted from the Isthmian League.

Team Bath announced that they were to leave the Football Conference from the end of the 2008–09 season. The club decided to fold, after being informed they could not be promoted to the professional leagues, which also led to them no longer being able to play FA Cup games. Thus Thurrock were reprieved from relegation.

Promotion and relegation
Teams promoted from 2008–09 Isthmian League Premier Division
 Dover Athletic
 Staines Town

Teams relegated from 2008–09 Conference Premier
 Lewes
 Woking
 Weymouth

League table

Play-offs

Stadia and locations

Results

Monthly awards

References

 
National League (English football) seasons
Eng
5